Irish Guard may refer to:
 Irish Guard (Notre Dame), part of the marching band at University of Notre Dame football games
 Irish Guards, regiment of the British Army
 Garda Síochána, police force in Ireland whose members are colloquially called "guards"